A list of films produced in Spain in 1974 (see 1974 in film).

1974

External links
 Spanish films of 1974 at the Internet Movie Database

1974
Spanish
Films